Pista ng Pelikulang Pilipino, abbreviated as PPP, is a film festival held in the Philippines in celebration of the Buwan ng Wika. It is organized by the Film Development Council of the Philippines. Similar to the Metro Manila Film Festival, only shortlisted films will be shown in cinemas except in select 3D cinemas, VIP cinemas (in an opt-in/opt-out basis by developer) and IMAX theaters.

The movies are classified into 3 categories. First are the Main Feature Films which are competing for the awards. Second are the "Sine Kabataan Shorts" which are 5-minute short films that are played before the feature film. Third are the Non-Competition entries which are movies that won in other film festivals and as such, are given special limited screening during the PPP festival.

2017 edition
The first edition featuring 12 locally produced films selected by the Film Development Council of the Philippines was held from August 16 to 22, 2017.

Entries
Entry films had to be submitted in a finished state by June 15, 2017. The official entries were determined by a selection committee composed of Erik Matti, Joey Javier Reyes, Manet A. Dayrit, Ricky Lee, Lee Meily, Oggs Cruz, and Iza Calzado. The official entries were revealed on June 30, 2017.

100 Tula Para Kay Stella by Jason Paul Laxamana
AWOL by Enzo Willaims
Bar Boys by Kip Oebanda
Birdshot by Mikhail Red
Hamog by Ralston Jover
Ang Manananggal sa Unit 23B by Prime Cruz
Paglipay by Zig Dulay
Patay na si Hesus by Victor Villanueva
Pauwi Na by Paolo Villaluna
Salvage by Sherad Anthony Sanchez
Star na si Van Damme Stallone by Randolph Longjas
Triptiko by Miguel Franco Michelena

Sine Kabataan Shorts
Haraya by Daniel Delgado
Fat You by Ronnel Rivera III)
Dorothy by Angelique Evangelista)
Delayed Si Jhemerlyn Rose by Don Senoc
Alipato by Michael Joshua Manahan
Akalingwan Nang Rosa by Max Canlas
Ya Right by Gab Mesina
Shaded by Vanneza Clear Estanol
Ang Unang Araw ng Pasukan by Ar-Jen Manlapig
Pahimakas by Lance Maravillas
Ang Kapitbahay Ko Sa 2014 by Anya Nepomuceno
Makartur by Brian Spencer Reyes

2018 edition
The second edition will be held on August 15 to 21, 2018 in all theaters nationwide, except specialty cinemas including, among others, IMAX, 4DX, Director’s Club, A-Giant (Large Format Cinema), Christie laser projection powered and all Gold Class Screens. However, there are some entries like Ang Babaeng Allergic sa WiFi shown in Director's Clubs in SM Aura in Taguig City and Madilim ang Gabi and Pinay Beauty in SM City East Ortigas in Pasig. On August 18, 2018, foreign movies continued showing in regular cinemas.

8 main entries
Entry films had to be submitted in a finished state by June 15, 2018. The finalists were revealed on July 9, 2018 at the Sequioa Hotel in Quezon City.
Ang Babaeng Allergic sa WiFi by Jun Robles Lana
Bakwit Boys by Jason Paul Laxamana
The Day After Valentine's by Jason Paul Laxamana
Madilim ang Gabi (Dark is The Night) by Adolfo Alix Jr.
Pinay Beauty by Jay Abello
Signal Rock by Chito Roño
Unli Life by Miko Livelo
We Will Not Die Tonight by Richard Somes

Sine Kabataan Shorts
Koleksyong Pamalo by Jocelyn Frago
Bato Bato Pik by Lorys Plaza and Ardinian Sanque
Masaya Ako by Daniel Delgado and Tiara Angelica Nicolas 
Alas-Nuebe ng Tanghali by Enalyn Legaspi
Runner by Levi Jun Miscala 
Anonymous Student Vlog by Christian Babista
Bahay-bahayan by Brian Spencer Reyes
Isang Tula Para Sa Nawawala by Rod Singh

Non-Competition Feature Films
Balangiga: Howling Wilderness by Khavn (QCinema International Film Festival 2017 Circle Competition Best Picture)
Gusto Kita With All My Hypothalamus by Dwein Baltazar (CineFilipino 2018 2nd Best Picture)
High Tide by Tara Illenberger (TOFARM Film Festival 2017 Best Picture)
Kiko Boksingero by Thop Nazareno (Cinemalaya 2017)
Paki by Giancarlo Abrahan (Cinema One Originals 2017 Best Picture)
Tu Pug Imatuy by Arnel Barbarona (Sinag Maynila 2017 Best Picture)

2019 edition
The third PPP will be held at this special year as 2019  starts the official celebration of the One Hundred 
Years of Philippine Cinema, pursuant to Presidential Proclamation 622, S. 2018 which declares September 12, 2019 to September 11, 2020 as Philippine Cinema’s Centennial Year. In line with this, PPP will be held on  September 13–19, 2019 to serve as the official kick off of the celebration of Sandaan (One Hundred Years) as we showcase Filipino films exclusively in all cinemas nationwide, except specialty cinemas including, among others, VIP cinemas, large-format cinemas, IMAX and 4DX.

7 main entries
 Cuddle Weather by Rod Marmol
 G! by Dondon Santos
 I'm Ellenya L. by Boy 2 Quizon
 LSS: Last Song Syndrome by Jade Castro
 Open by Andoy Ranay
 The Panti Sisters by Jun Robles Lana
 Watch Me Kill by Tyrone Acierto

PPP Sandaan Showcase
 Circa by Adolf Alix Jr.
 Lola Igna by Eduardo Roy Jr.
 Pagbalik by Hubert Tibi & Maria Ranillo

Sine Kabataan Shorts
Atchoy by Regin De Guzman
Baon by Czareena Rozhiell Malasig
Chok by Richard Jeroui Salvadico & Arlie Sweet Sumagaysay
Kalakalaro by Rodson Verr C. Suarez
Kanlungan by Leslie Ann Ramirez
Magna by Geoffrey Jules Solidum
Pinggu, pwede na? by Elle Marie Ubas & Johanna Valdez
Tinay by Andre Jacques Fallari Tigno & Angelo Fernando
Toto, tawag ka ng ate mo by Mary Franz Salazar

Non-Competition Feature Film
 Verdict (aka Judgement, 2019 Venice Film Festival Special Jury Prize) by Raymund Ribay Gutierrez

Winners

Full-Length

Major Awards

Production Awards

Special Awards

Sine Kabataan Shorts 
The Sine Kabataan Short Film Competition gives a platform to all aspiring young filmmakers. It is open to all filmmakers of ages 15 to 30 years old. This serves to encourage the youth to develop their creativity and originality in storytelling, touching on important issues of today as perceived by the youth. The 5-minute Sine Kabataan Short Films are paired with PPP full feature counterparts and are screened in all cinemas nationwide.

Box Office

See also
Cinemalaya Film Festival
Metro Manila Film Festival
QCinema International Film Festival
Cinema One Originals Film Festival
Cinema of the Philippines

References

Film festivals in the Philippines